Decline & Fall is an EP by English industrial metal band Godflesh. It was released on 2 June 2014 through frontman Justin Broadrick's own record label, Avalanche Recordings. The EP is the second release by Godflesh since Hymns (2001), following the 2013 single "F.O.D. (Fuck of Death)". It precedes the group's seventh studio album, A World Lit Only by Fire (2014), and the two were recorded in the same sessions.

The track "Ringer" was released for streaming in May 2014 on the band's SoundCloud account.

Background and composition
When mixing began for Godflesh's return studio album, A World Lit Only by Fire, Broadrick found that there was more material than he wanted to include on a single release. To keep the album under an hour, he cut the more "colorful" and "dynamic" outlying tracks and combined them to create Decline & Fall. In a 2014 interview with the French publication La Grosse Radio, Broadrick spoke about the value of the EP format, explaining that it allows for more experimentation because the general public doesn't consider it as important as a studio album release.

Decline & Fall and the following album feature extensive use of an eight-string guitar. The guitar, a signature model, was provided to Broadrick by Blakhart. On the use of this instrument, Broadrick stated:

Musically, Decline & Fall is a heavy industrial metal release with extremely distorted, low and repetitive guitar work layered over similarly distorted bass from B. C. Green and Godflesh's signature drum machine beats. The EP marked a return to the group's mechanical percussion after 2001's Hymns, which featured live drumming by Ted Parsons. Decline & Fall is intentionally dissonant and rough; Zoe Camp of Pitchfork wrote that the production of the EP could be heard as a response to the sanitation of industrial music, saying that "Godflesh remain fiercely loyal to lo-fi, treating songs as caustic exercises in overstimulation."

Critical reception

Decline and Fall was met with positive reviews. Zoe Camp of Pitchfork gave the EP a positive review, writing, "Avant and yet strangely accessible, industrially-minded but all-embracing, Decline & Fall confirms that a decade-plus-long absence has dulled neither Godflesh’s industrial spirit, nor their devotion to experimentation." Gregory Heany of AllMusic described the EP as "sludgy, grime-covered industrial metal that feels like a promising preview for their first post-breakup full-length, A World Lit Only by Fire." Maya Kalev of Resident Advisor wrote, "Even when it seems like Godflesh are re-treading old ground, the effect is never less than thrilling."

Decline & Fall drew favorable comparisons to early Godflesh releases, like their 1988 self-titled EP and their debut album, Streetcleaner (1989).

Track listing
All songs written by Justin Broadrick and G.C. Green.

Personnel
 Justin Broadrick – vocals, eight-string guitar, production
 B. C. Green – bass
 Machines – drums, rhythm

References

External links
 Godflesh – Decline & Fall on Bandcamp

2014 EPs
Godflesh EPs
Justin Broadrick albums
Albums produced by Justin Broadrick
Self-released EPs